is a Japanese former footballer.

Career

Afetr playing in Singapore and Thailand, Yoshino played in Myanmar, where he established a charity to help local children.

Career statistics

Club

Notes

References

1985 births
Living people
Sportspeople from Saitama Prefecture
Association football people from Saitama Prefecture
Seisa Dohto University alumni
Japanese footballers
Japanese expatriate footballers
Association football defenders
Albirex Niigata Singapore FC players
Woodlands Wellington FC players
Kazuki Yoshino
Blaublitz Akita players
Zweigen Kanazawa players
Yangon United F.C. players
Singapore Premier League players
Japan Football League players
Japanese expatriate sportspeople in Singapore
Expatriate footballers in Singapore
Japanese expatriate sportspeople in Myanmar
Expatriate footballers in Myanmar